Carl McVoy (January 3, 1931 – January 3, 1992) was an American pianist.

Career
McVoy was cousin to the younger Jerry Lee Lewis. He had been to New York City with his father, who had been a minister there. McVoy got hooked on boogie-woogie while in New York, which he subsequently brought back to Pine Bluff, Arkansas. Jerry Lee Lewis would visit his older cousin and get him to show him things on the piano.

Plucked from the construction industry by Ray Harris, McVoy recorded "You Are My Sunshine" at Sun Records, which was the single that launched Hi Records. McVoy recorded a number of other sides at Sun in 1957 and 1958, most of which have remained unissued.

He subsequently went back to Hi as pianist with The Bill Black Combo, but quit in the mid-1960s and returned to the construction industry forming his own company Carmack Construction. He died on his 61st birthday in 1992.

References

External links
A discography

1931 births
1992 deaths
Phillips International Records artists
American blues pianists
American male pianists
20th-century American pianists
20th-century American male musicians